Cibolo is a city in Guadalupe County, Texas, United States. It is part of the San Antonio–New Braunfels metropolitan statistical area. Cibolo voted to become an independent township on October 9, 1965. As of the 2020 census, Cibolo had a population of 32,276, up from 15,349 at the 2010 census.

History
Cibolo voted to become an independent township on October 9, 1965; the "City Fathers" were Mayor M.O. Grooms, Councilman Carl Biser, Councilman Ted Dykes, Councilman Alwin Lieck, Councilman Fred Niemietz, and Councilman D.O. Trotti. 

Before the first European settlers arrived, the Comanche and several other Native American tribes lived in Cibolo. The name Cibolo means "buffalo". The community first established when the Southern Pacific Railroad cut through the area en route to major cities such as Houston and San Antonio. Over time, Cibolo developed into the suburb it is today.

In 1867, George Schlather built a store on land purchased by his father Jacob. In 1882, the Schlathers sold the store to Charles Fromme, who renamed it Fromme's Store. The community also became known by this name. In 1877, the Galveston, Harrisburg and San Antonio Railway station serving the area was called Cibolo Valley. In 1883, the US Post Office opened a branch in the town and called it Cibolo. By 1890, its population was 100 people.

Beginning in the 21st century, Cibolo has experienced high levels of growth, increasing 733% since 2000, when the population was 3,035 people.  Between 2000 and 2010, the population increased 545% to 19,580 people.  As Cibolo has grown, its share of the county population has also increased.  In 2000, Cibolo accounted for only 3.4% of Guadalupe County's population, but between 2000 and 2010, Cibolo captured 38.9% of the county's growth, and its share of the population increased to 14.9%.  Between 2010 and 2013, Cibolo acquired 22.3% of the growth in Guadalupe County, and today Cibolo accounts for 17% of the county's population.

Geography
Cibolo is in western Guadalupe County, on the north side of Cibolo Creek. A small portion of the city, south of West Schaefer Road, crosses a bend of Cibolo Creek to enter Bexar County. Santa Clara and Marion border Cibolo to the east. New Berlin, Zuehl, and St. Hedwig border Cibolo to the south. Schertz borders Cibolo to the north and west.

Transportation

Airports
 Austin-Bergstrom International Airport is about an hour away via I-35.
 San Antonio International Airport is 30 minutes away via I-35 and I-410.

Major thoroughfares
  Interstate 35, Duluth-Des Moines-Kansas City-Wichita-Oklahoma City-DFW Metroplex-Austin-Cibolo-San Antonio-Laredo
  Interstate 10, Jacksonville-Houston-Cibolo-San Antonio-Fort Stockton-El Paso-Los Angeles
 , Kirby-I 35-Randolph AFB-Cibolo-Marion-McQueeney-Seguin
 , Cibolo
 The proposed Cibolo Parkway as an extension of FM 1103.  The Parkway would create a direct route from I-35 to I-10.

Cibolo Parkway (Proposed) 
In 2006, the City of Cibolo incorporated mobility needs into the Cibolo Future Land Use Map, Future Thoroughfare Plan, and Capital Improvement Plan.

In 2007, the Texas Department of Transportation (TxDOT) completed a study for a possible FM 1103 extension in Cibolo south to I-10. However, TxDOT determined that right-of-way acquisition issues and funding precluded such an extension for the near future. The biggest hurdles included crossing floodplains and an overpass over both FM78 and the Union Pacific Railroad.

In 2015, with explosive development in the FM 1103 area continuing, the Cibolo City Council stated they wanted to investigate options to build the extension and it formed a blue-ribbon committee of citizens to study the matter. In 2016, the committee recommended a private-public partnership to develop the road as a tollway.

In 2017, the Cibolo City Council approved an agreement with the Texas Turnpike Corporation (TTC) to move forward with the project. As of early 2018, the TTC is still conducting its feasibility study for the road to see if it is a viable project for them.   
In the agreement, the City of Cibolo would own the road, while TTC would finance the design, construction, maintenance, and operation of the estimated $125 million and roughly 11-mile roadway. In exchange, TTC would collect tolls from roadway users for 50 years.  At one point TTC projected the toll rate to be $0.20 a mile, with exemption for city-owned vehicles.

On January 14, 2020, the Cibolo City Council voted unanimously to terminate the agreement between the City and TTC and Cibolo Turnpike, LP (CTLP), drawing demands for mediation from CTLP.

Demographics

As of the 2020 United States census, 32,276 people, 9,106 households, and 7,863 families were residing in the city.

As of the census of 2000,  3,035 people, 1,092 households, and 848 families were residing in the city. The population density was 569.5 people per square mile (219.9/km2). The 1,176 housing units had an average density of 220.7/sq mi (85.2/km2). The racial makeup of the city was 81.09% White, 6.16% African American, 0.26% Native American, 1.35% Asian, 8.21% from other races, and 2.93% from two or more races. Hispanics or Latinos of any race were 19.01% of the population.

Of the 1,092 households, 42.8% had children under 18 living with them, 65.3% were married couples living together, 8.9% had a female householder with no husband present, and 22.3% were not families. About 19.2% of all households were made up of individuals, and 6.0% had someone living alone who was 65 or older. The average household size was 2.78, and the average family size was 3.19.

In the city, the age distribution was 29.4% under 18, 7.1% from 18 to 24, 35.6% from 25 to 44, 21.8% from 45 to 64, and 6.2% who were 65 or older. The median age was 35 years. For every 100 females, there were 91.8 males. For every 100 females 18 and over, there were 90.3 males.

The median income for a household in the city was $53,780, and for a family was $65,545. Males had a median income of $42,557 versus $26,333 for females. The per capita income for the city was $23,988. About 4.8% of families and 6.1% of the population were below the poverty line, including 7.7% of those under 18 and 16.6% of those 65 or over.

By the mid-2010s, Cibolo was one of the fastest-growing small cities in the United States, experiencing a nearly 900% increase in population since 2000 and growing from 3,000 to the current estimate of about 30,000 residents. Actual figures are disputed, however, due to such a huge explosion of population in such a short period of time. This has caused problems in the city, due to such unanticipated growth making developments difficult to keep up with the rapidly increasing population, and a limited amount of land.

Population over time 

 1970 Census – 440
 1980 Census – 549 
 1990 Census – 1,757 
 2000 Census – 3,035
 2010 Census – 15,349
2020 Census – 32,276

Government 
The City of Cibolo is a "home rule" city. Cibolo voters adopted its initial "home rule" charter in 2005. Cibolo residents have voted to amend the charter twice since 2005:

 November 2013, voters approved 28 of 29 propositions presented.
 November 2018, voters approved 15 of 15 propositions presented.

The City of Cibolo is a council-manager type government.  The city has a mayor and seven council members elected for three-year terms, with a two-term maximum.  The seven council members currently are elected by and represent individual districts. Council members' duties include enacting local legislation (ordinances), adopting budgets, determining policies, and appointing the city manager, secretary, and attorney.

The City of Cibolo is also a member of the Alamo Area Council of Governments.

Schools 
Schertz-Cibolo-Universal City Independent School District (SCUCISD) serves Cibolo students and families.

High schools 

The high schools cover grades 9–12.

 Allison Steele Enhanced Learning Center (Schertz)
 Byron P. Steele High School (Cibolo)
Samuel Clemens High School (Schertz)

Junior high schools 
The junior high schools cover grades 7–8.

J. Frank Dobie Junior High (Cibolo)
 Ray D. Corbett Junior High (Schertz)

Intermediate schools 
The intermediate schools cover grades 5–6.

Barbara Jordan Intermediate (Cibolo)
Laura Ingalls Wilder Intermediate (Schertz)
 Elaine S. Schlather Intermediate (Cibolo)

Elementary schools 

The elementary schools cover kindergarten through grade 4, as well as preschool.

 Cibolo Valley Elementary (Cibolo)
 Green Valley Elementary (Schertz)
 Maxine & Lutrell Watts Elementary (Cibolo)
 Norma J. Paschal Elementary (Schertz)
 O.G. Wiederstein Elementary (Cibolo)
 Rose Garden Elementary (Schertz)
 As of August 2018, the former Rose Garden Elementary (Universal City) will close down.
 Schertz Elementary (Schertz)
 John A. Sippel Elementary (Schertz)

Notable people

 Tommy Armstrong Jr., professional football player for the Sioux Falls Storm
 Malcolm Brown, professional football player 
  Caden Sterns, professional football player for the  Denver Broncos
  Terence Steele, professional football player for the Dallas Cowboys

References

External links

 City of Cibolo official website

Cities in Texas
Cities in Guadalupe County, Texas
Cities in Bexar County, Texas
Greater San Antonio
New Braunfels, Texas